Saarijärvi is a town and municipality of Finland. It is located in the Central Finland region. The municipality has a population of 
which 
is water.  The population density is
.

Neighbouring municipalities are Kannonkoski, Karstula, Multia, Soini, Uurainen, Ähtäri and Äänekoski.

The municipality is unilingually Finnish. The neighboring municipality of Pylkönmäki was consolidated to Saarijärvi on 1 January 2009.

There are all together 241 lakes in Saarijärvi. Biggest lakes are Pyhäjärvi, Summanen and Lake Saarijärvi.

Saarijärvi is the home of Bonden Paavo in the poem by Johan Ludvig Runeberg. Juho Hyytiäinen, the great grandfather of Pamela Anderson, left the village in 1908 emigrating to the American continent.

History 
Saarijärvi has existed since the mid-16th century, when it was a part of the Rautalampi parish. Saarijärvi acquired its first church in 1628, which was also when the Laukaa parish, including Saarijärvi, was separated from Rautalampi. Saarijärvi became a separate parish in 1639 as Palvasalmi. At the time, the parish also included Karstula, Kyyjärvi, Pylkönmäki and a part of Konginkangas. The parish was renamed to Saarijärvi sometime after 1690.

Karstula, including Kyyjärvi, was separated in 1887, Konginkangas in 1895 (partially from Viitasaari) and Pylkönmäki in 1914. Saarijärvi became a town in 1986. Pylkönmäki rejoined Saarijärvi in 2009.

Twin towns - sister cities
Saarijärvi is twinned with:
 Gran, Norway
 Kungsbacka, Sweden
 Trittau (Amt), Germany

Transport
Saarijärvi is served by OnniBus.com route Helsinki—Jyväskylä—Kokkola.

People born in Saarijärvi
Matthias Calonius (1738 – 1817)
Samuli Häkkinen (1857 – 1918)
Otto Stenroth (1861 – 1939)
Adiel Paananen (1897 – 1968)
Tarmo Manni (1921 – 1999)
Toivo Hyytiäinen (1925 – 1978) 
Kain Tapper (1930 – 2004)

See also
 Finnish national road 58

References

External links

 Town of Saarijärvi – Official website, finnish, russian, english and swedish

 
Cities and towns in Finland
Populated places established in 1866
1866 establishments in the Russian Empire